Redwood Curtain is an American drama television film that premiered on ABC on April 23, 1995, as part of the Hallmark Hall of Fame anthology series. The film is directed by John Korty from a teleplay by Ed Namzug, based on the play of the same name by Lanford Wilson. It stars Jeff Daniels, Lea Salonga, Debra Monk, Catherine Hicks, and John Lithgow, with Daniels and Monk reprising their roles from the original 1993 Broadway production. The film earned a Primetime Emmy Award nomination for its sound mixing.

Premise
In her search for her biological father, an Amerasian piano prodigy comes to California's redwood forests to an area populated by Vietnam veterans unable to reintegrate into society.

Cast
 Jeff Daniels as Lyman Fellers
 Lea Salonga as Geri Riordan
 Catherine Hicks as Julia Riordan
 John Lithgow as Laird Riordan
 Debra Monk as Geneva Riordan
 Shirley Douglas as Schyler Noyes
 Vilma Silva as Zenaida
 Joy Carlin as Mrs. Cole
 Steven Anthony Jones as Nate Stone
 Jarion Monroe as Leon Shea
 Cab Covay as Mad John
 R. Blakeslee Colby as Reverend Grant
 Jonathan Korty as Dennis McCaw

Reception

Critical response
Jeremy Gerard of Variety noted that the original stage play was a "spookily amorphous affair", and that it included an "edgy, funny performance by Debra Monk."  Of the television film, Gerard called it a "ponderous, cliche-riddled adaptation", with a performance by Monk that suffered in her character having her "spirit drained". Conversely, Gerard commended director John Korty in his drawing "a nicely restrained performance out of John Lithgow". Ken Tucker of Entertainment Weekly wrote that the film "is full of fortune-cookie verbiage". Tom Jicha of the Sun-Sentinel praised the performances of the cast, but criticized the story, calling it "lethargic" and "two hours of talking heads on uninteresting or unlikable bodies".

Accolades

References

External links
 
 
 

1995 films
1995 drama films
1995 television films
1990s American films
1990s English-language films
ABC network original films
American drama television films
American films based on plays
Hallmark Hall of Fame episodes
Films about adoption
Films about father–daughter relationships
Films about veterans
Films about Vietnamese Americans
Films directed by John Korty
Films set in forests
Films set in California
Films shot in California
Republic Pictures films